Heracleum sphondylium, commonly known as hogweed, common hogweed or cow parsnip, is a herbaceous perennial or biennial plant, in the umbelliferous family Apiaceae that includes fennel, cow parsley, ground elder and giant hogweed. It is native to Europe and Asia. The common name eltrot may also be applied, but is not specific to this species. Umbelliferous plants are so named because of the umbrella-like arrangement of flowers they produce. The North American species Heracleum maximum (also called "cow parsnip") is sometimes included as a subspecies of H. sphondylium.

The plant provides a great deal of nectar for pollinators. It was rated in the top 10 for most nectar production (nectar per unit cover per year) in a UK plants survey conducted by the AgriLand project which is supported by the UK Insect Pollinators Initiative.

Etymology
The species name sphondylium, meaning "vertebrate", refers to the shape of the segmented stem. It was described by Carl Linnaeus in 1753.

Description
The hollow, ridged stem with bristly hairs arises from a large tap root. The leaves can reach   of length. They are once or twice pinnate, hairy and serrated, divided into 3–5 lobed segments.

Hogweed has 5-petalled pinkish or white flowers, arranged in umbels usually less than 30 cm of diameter with 15 to 30 rays. The peripheral flowers have a radial symmetry (zygomorphic). The terminal umbels are flat-topped and the outermost petals are enlarged. Flowering typically occurs between June and October.

The flowers are pollinated by insects, such as beetles, wasps and especially flies. The small fruits are schizocarps, flattened and winged, elliptical to rounded and glabrous, up to 1 cm long. The seed dispersal is by wind (anemochory).

The characteristic 'farm yardy' smell or the observation that pigs would eat the foliage and roots of hogweed is perhaps the origin of its common name. The leaves are commonly mined by the larvae of the leaf miner Phytomyza spondylii.

Heracleum sphondylium is smaller than dangerous Heracleum mantegazzianum (giant hogweed) and Heracleum sosnowskyi (Sosnowsky's hogweed), and should not be confused. However, it contains some of the same phytophototoxic compounds (furanocoumarins), albeit at lower concentrations, and there is evidence that the sap from common hogweed can also produce phytophotodermatitis (burns and rashes) when contaminated skin is exposed to sunlight. Care therefore needs to be used when cutting or trimming it, to prevent 'strimmers rash'.

The small picture-winged fly Euleia heraclei is, as its name suggests, found on hogweed.

Distribution
Heracleum sphondylium has a Eurasian distribution, growing throughout Europe and eastwards to central Asia. Its native range just extends into North Africa. The species has been introduced to suitable habitats elsewhere, such as Canada and the U.S. In particular, H. sphondylium is recorded as introduced to Ontario by the Database of Vascular Plants of Canada but reports of H. sphondylium in Canada are rare.

Habitat
The plant is common in grassland, herb-rich meadows, in hedges, meadows and woods, road verges and railway embankments, waste and cultivated ground. It grows especially well on moist, improved nitrogen-rich soils.

Uses
In the 18th century, people on the Kamchatka Peninsula distilled a spirit called raka from a "sweet grass" that was most likely H. sphondylium. The raka was flavored with blue-berried honeysuckle (Lonicera caerulea).

Borscht derives from an ancient soup originally cooked from pickled stems, leaves and umbels of common hogweed. The young shoots are considered excellent eating by many foragers.

In eastern European countries and especially Romania, H. sphondylium is used as an aphrodisiac and to treat gynecological and fertility problems and impotence. It is also sometimes recommended for epilepsy. However, there are no clinical studies to prove its efficacy at treating any of these problems.

The seeds can be dried and used as a spice, with a flavour similar to that of cardamom.

Subspecies
This species has variable characteristics and many forms have been described. The following names are accepted by The Plant List:

 H. sphondylium var. akasimontanum (Koidz.) H. Ohba
 H. sphondylium subsp. algeriense (Coss. ex Batt. & Trab.) Dobignard
 H. sphondylium subsp. alpinum (L.) Bonnier & Layens
 H. sphondylium subsp. aurasiacum (Maire) Dobignard
 H. sphondylium subsp. embergeri Maire
 H. sphondylium subsp. granatense (Boiss.) Briq.
 H. sphondylium var. lanatum (Michx.) Dorn
 H. sphondylium subsp. montanum (Schleich. ex Gaudin) Briq. (synonyms: Heracleum lanatum, Heracleum maximum)
 H. sphondylium var. nipponicum (Kitag.) H. Ohba
 H. sphondylium subsp. orsinii (Guss.) H.Neumayer
 H. sphondylium subsp. pyrenaicum (Lam.) Bonnier & Layens
 H. sphondylium subsp. sibiricum (L.) Simonk. (synonym: Heracleum sibiricum L.)
 H. sphondylium subsp. suaveolens (Litard. & Maire) Dobignard
 H. sphondylium subsp. ternatum (Velen.) Brummitt
 H. sphondylium subsp. transsilvanicum (Schur) Brummitt
 H. sphondylium subsp. trifoliolatum (Blanch.) Kerguélen
 H. sphondylium var. tsaurugisanense (Honda) H. Ohba
 H. sphondylium subsp. verticillatum (Pančić) Brummitt

Similar species
The water parsnip (Sium suave), western water hemlock (Cicuta douglasii) and spotted water hemlock (Cicuta maculata) all have white flowers in large compound umbels, which can lead to misidentification. All water hemlock and poison hemlock are highly poisonous, but water parsnip is not. Both have clusters of small white flowers shaped like umbrellas, and have the same habitat near the shore line of lakes and rivers. Water parsnip has leaves only once compound, and water hemlock has leaves which are three times compound. Water hemlock has a large swelling at the stem base, and has bracts at the base of each small flower cluster, not at the base of the main flower head. The water parsnip has small bracts at the base of flowers and main flower head as well.  The cow parsnips (Heracleum lanatum, Heracleum maximum) are also confused in this group with similar flower groupings. However, the cow parsnips have large, broad leaves, and an unpleasant odour.

See also
 Heracleum, the genus
 Other non-invasive Heracleum species: Heracleum maximum
 Tall invasive Heracleum species: Heracleum mantegazzianum, Heracleum sosnowskyi, and Heracleum persicum
 Species that can be mistaken for Heracleum sphondylium: wild parsnip, garden angelica, wild angelica

References

External links

Apioideae
Medicinal plants of Asia
Medicinal plants of Europe
Plants described in 1753
Taxa named by Carl Linnaeus